Senator Kean or Keane may refer to:

Members of the United States Senate
Hamilton Fish Kean (1862–1941), U.S. Senator from New Jersey from 1929 to 1935
John Kean (New Jersey politician) (1852–1914), U.S. Senator from New Jersey from 1899 to 1911

United States state senate members
Sean T. Kean (born 1963), New Jersey State Senate
Thomas Kean Jr. (born 1968), New Jersey State Senate
Jim Keane (politician), Montana State Senate
Thomas E. Keane (1905–1996), Illinois State Senate

See also
Joe Keene Jr., fictional U.S. Senator from Watchmen franchise media